Princess Vibhavadi Rangsit (20 November 1920 – 16 February 1977), née Princess Vibhavadi Rajani was a Thai writer and a member of the Thai royal family well known for her fiction writing and her developmental work in rural Thailand.

She was killed by communist insurgents while on a routine visit to assist rural villagers in Surat Thani Province.

Early life
Princess Vibhavadi Rangsit was born on 20 November 1920. She was the eldest daughter of Rajani Chamcharas, Prince Bidyalongkorn and Princess Phonphimonphan Rajani (née Princess Phimonphan Voravan). She had a sibling, Prince Bhisadej Rajani.

The princess was educated at the Mater Dei School, Bangkok. After completing her secondary education, she worked as a secretary for her father, who at the time was one of the most respected poets of the Rattanakosin era and wrote under the pseudonym No. Mo. So. (NMS). Princess Vibhavadi inherited her father's gift for writing and displayed her ability as early as age of fourteen, when she began writing children's novels. She was well known by her pen-name V. na Pramuanmarg ( Wo Na Pramuanmak). Her famous first novel, Prisana ( Pritsana), was written when she was eighteen and was followed by two sequels and many other novels, some of them historical.

Marriage
Princess Vibhavadi Rangsit married Prince Piyarangsit Rangsit, eldest son of Rangsit Prayurasakdi, Prince of Chainat and Elisabeth Scharnberger, on 6 May 1946. They were the only couple married by King Ananda Mahidol (Rama VIII). She had two daughters:
 Mom Rajawongse Vibhananda Rangsit ( Wiphanan Rangsit)
 Mom Rajawongse Priyanandana Rangsit ( Priyananthana Rangsit)

Work

In addition to a full writing career, the princess worked for her third cousin, King Bhumibol Adulyadej and his consort, Queen Sirikit of Thailand. In 1957, she began accompanying them when they toured the country and was appointed a lady-in-waiting to the queen when they went on their first state visit abroad in 1960. Princess Vibhavadi accompanied them on seven occasions, visiting twenty-five countries.

The last ten years of her life were dedicated to rural development in southern Thailand under the direction and sponsorship of the king. Her involvement began when the monarch asked her to go to a remote area called Phrasaeng in Surat Thani Province. From that initial visit in 1967, she was committed to the development of neglected areas and the improvement of the villagers' living standards. Sponsored by the king, she led a medical team on many missions to distribute medical supplies, schooling equipment, blankets, and other necessities to villagers in remote and almost inaccessible parts of the South.

Death
Princess Vibavadi often visited soldiers and Border Patrol Police stationed in areas where there was communist insurgency. On the morning of 16 February 1977, she set off on what should have been a routine visit to villages and to boost the morale of troops at Wiang Sa District, Surat Thani. While flying to her destination in an army helicopter, she heard a radio message saying two Border Patrol Policemen had been wounded by a landmine. She immediately ordered the flight diverted to pick up the wounded men and rush them to a hospital. As they flew at low altitude over Ban Nua Khlong, the helicopter was attacked from the ground by communist insurgents. A burst of heavy machine gun fire crippled the helicopter and seriously wounded the princess. She died one hour later.

Prior to her royally sponsored cremation at Ratchabophit Temple, on 4 April 1977, "in recognition of her services to the country and the people", the king elevated her to the higher royal rank of Phra Chao Worawongse Ther Phra Ong Chao (Her Royal Highness) and awarded her the highest level of the most Illustrious Order of the House of Chakri.

Legacy
February 16 is now known in Surat Thani as Vibhavadi Day, and civil and religious ceremonies are held in her honour. Vibhavadi Rangsit Highway, which connects Don Mueang International Airport with Bangkok, was named for the beloved princess.

Her husband, Prince Piya Rangsit, founded the Vibhavadi Rangsit Foundation to ensure the continuity of her charitable work in the southern provinces.

Vibhavadi Rangsit Road, which runs from Phaya Thai District in Bangkok to Lam Luk Ka District in Pathumthani was also named in her honour.

Honours

Paramilitary rank 
 14 March 1977 : Volunteer Defense Corps Colonel (posthumous promoted)

Decorations 
 16 July 1953 :  King Rama IX Royal Cypher Medal, Third Class
 9 May 1957 :  Companion of the Most Illustrious Order of Chula Chom Klao
 5 May 1961 :  Dame Commander of the Most Illustrious Order of Chula Chom Klao
 5 May 1968 :   Dame Grand Commander of the Most Illustrious Order of Chula Chom Klao
 4 April 1977 :  Dame Grand Cross of the Most Exalted Order of the White Elephant (posthumous awarded)
 4 April 1977 :  Knight of the Most Illustrious the Most Illustrious Order of the Royal House of Chakri (posthumous awarded)
 1960 :  Knight Commander of the Order of Merit of the Federal Republic of Germany

Ancestors

References 

1920 births
1977 deaths
Thai female Phra Ong Chao
Rangsit family
Rajani family
Murdered royalty
Assassinated Thai people
Deaths by firearm in Thailand
Thai novelists
Ladies-in-waiting
Dames Grand Commander of the Order of Chula Chom Klao
Knights Commander of the Order of Merit of the Federal Republic of Germany
Thai women novelists
20th-century Thai women writers
20th-century novelists
20th-century Chakri dynasty
Vorawan family
Thai female Mom Chao
Thai princesses consort